Man on Earth is a four-part British documentary television series presented by Tony Robinson. The programme documents the effects of climate change across 200,000 years of human history. The series premiered 7 December 2009 on Channel 4 with 1.4 million viewers. Accompanying Robinson to help explain the science are archaeologist Jago Cooper and climate modeller Joy Singarayer.

Episodes

Reception 
Sam Wollaston of The Guardian said the programme is "interesting and intelligently done – no embarrassing reconstructions with hairy chaps brandishing spears and grunting". However, Jeremy Clay of the Leicester Mercury felt that the programme covered much of the same material as the BBC's The Incredible Human Journey, which aired earlier in the year. Clay was also not confident in the choice of Tony Robinson as the presenter saying that he "exudes enthusiasm rather than authority, and delivered some of his facts to camera with the air of a man who's only recently heard them himself".

See also 
 Current effects of global warming
 Climatology
 The Weather of the Future

References

External links 

 Ancient Weather This appears to be the same 4-part series - it aired on History Channel in Canada with this title.

2009 British television series debuts
2009 British television series endings
British documentary television series
Channel 4 original programming